Savarna may refer to:
Savarna (gotra) , Hindu clan.
Savarna, genus of spiders.
Savarna Deergha Sandhi, a 2019 film.